Papadindar may refer to:

Papadindar-e Olya
Papadindar-e Sofla